Vasum rhinoceros, common name the rhinoceros vase snail or rhinoceros vase shell, is a species of large predatory sea snail, a marine gastropod mollusk within the family Turbinellidae.

Subspecies
 Vasum rhinoceros attolinoi T. Cossignani, 2017
 Vasum rhinoceros rhinoceros (Gmelin, 1791)

Description
The length of the shell: up to 90 mm, similar to Vasum turbinellus, in shape, but more rosy pink with light brown patches. The parietal wall is yellow-brown.The columella is wide, orange pink, with only three folds and large nodules on the shoulder. (Richmond, 1997).

Distribution
This species occurs in the Western Indian Ocean off Tanzania and Kenya.

Habitat
Shallow, rocky, sandy substrata.

References

 Spry, J.F. (1961). The sea shells of Dar es Salaam: Gastropods. Tanganyika Notes and Records 56

External links
 Gmelin, J. F. (1791). Vermes. In: Gmelin J.F. (Ed.) Caroli a Linnaei Systema Naturae per Regna Tria Naturae, Ed. 13. Tome 1(6). G.E. Beer, Lipsiae 
  Abbott, R. T. (1959). The family Vasidae in the Indo-Pacific. Indo-Pacific Mollusca. 1 (1): 15-32
 

hinoceros
Gastropods described in 1791